Max Golden (1895–1976) was an American film producer. He was employed by 20th Century Fox where he worked on B films including the Jones Family series.

Selected filmography
 Laughing at Trouble (1936)
 Educating Father (1936)
 Every Saturday Night (1936)
 The Jones Family in Big Business (1937)
 A Trip to Paris (1938)
 Hawaiian Nights (1939)

References

Bibliography
 John J. McGowan. J.P. McGowan: Biography of a Hollywood Pioneer. McFarland, 2005.

External links

1895 births
1976 deaths
American film producers